Haqnabad (also Romanized as Ḩaqnābād; also known as Haqqābād) is a village in Shabeh Rural District, Jangal District, Roshtkhar County, Razavi Khorasan Province, Iran. At the 2006 census, its population was 646, in 146 families.

References 

Populated places in Roshtkhar County